Velká Polom is a municipality and village in Ostrava-City District in the Moravian-Silesian Region of the Czech Republic. It has about 2,100 inhabitants.

History
The first written mention of Polom is from 1288, when Weikhard of Polom was mentioned. He is considered the founder of both the village and the local water fortress. In around 1416, the village was renamed Velká Polom to distinguish from the nearby Pustá Polom. The most notable owners of the village were three families: Donát family (1350–1486), Pražma family (1530–1666), and Wilczek family (1702–1918).

Sights

The Church Saint Wenceslaus was built in 1288 and is one of the oldest churches in Czech Silesia. It is one of five churches consecrated to Saint Wenceslaus which were built in the region in the 12th–13th century. The church was expanded in 1589, and the tower was added in 1741.

The former water fortress, locally called Milotička, is as old as the village. Between 1573 and 1600, it was modified in the Renaissance style. In 1805, it ceased to serve its purpose and turned into a granary and apartments. The building was devastated in the second half of the 20th century and today it is a ruin.

Notable people
Valentin Držkovic (1888–1969), painter

Twin towns – sister cities

Velká Polom is twinned with:
 Dlhá nad Oravou, Slovakia

References

External links

Villages in Ostrava-City District